= Shippur =

Shippur Tavandi Shippur
- Village
- Country: India
- State: Karnataka
- District: Belgaum
- Founder: Karnkumar Masu Kamble
- Talukas: Hukkeri

Languages
  - Official: Kannada, Marathi
- Time zone: UTC+5:30 (IST)
- Postal code: 591225
- Nearest city: Nipani, Gadhinglaj, Ajara

Shippur is a village in Belgaum district of Karnataka, India.

It has a nice temple of Ramalinga Devastan. It is a must place to visit during the Shravan Month, the yatra held on last Monday of Shravan every year. Every body should take blessings of lord shiva. Local language of shippur is Marathi. The total geographical area of village is 779.08 hectares. Shippur has a total population of 2,653 people. There are about 547 houses in Shippur village. Nipani and Gadhinglaj are the nearest towns to Shippur which is approximately 10 km away.

INC (congress) is the major political party in this area.
